Ernest Ludlow Bogart (March 16, 1870 – November 4, 1958) was an American economist. He was a professor of economics at the University of Illinois at Urbana–Champaign from 1909 to 1938. In 1931, he served as president of the American Economic Association.

References

External links 
 
 

1870 births
1958 deaths
American economists
University of Halle alumni
Princeton University alumni
University of Illinois Urbana-Champaign faculty
Presidents of the American Economic Association